The Garob Wind Power Station is an operational  wind power plant in South Africa. The power station was developed and is owned by Enel, the Italian manufacturer and distributor of electricity and gas infrastructure, through its subsidiary Enel Green Power of South Africa (EGPRSA). Construction of this wind farm started in April 2019 and achieved commercial operation in December 2021. The energy generated at this wind farm is sold to the South African national electricity utility company Eskom, under a 20-year power purchase agreement (PPA).

Location
The power station is located near the former mining town of Copperton, in Siyathemba Local Municipality, in the Karoo Region, in Northern Cape Province.

Overview
The concession for this wind farm was awarded to Enel in 2015, as part of the fourth round of the Renewable Energy Independent Power Producer Procurement Programme (REIPPPP), of the Republic of South Africa. Enel signed a 20-year power purchase agreement with Eskom.

During construction, the pylons that support the wind turbines were manufactured on-site, out of concrete and cement, instead of metal as is the usual method. This provided business for local suppliers and contractors. Nordex, the European supplier of the wind turbines, operates and maintains the power station on behalf of the owners.

Funding
Funding for this renewable energy infrastructure was sourced from two South African financial houses, namely Absa Group and Nedbank. The total cost of construction is reported to be in excess of €200 million (approx. US$225.7 million).

Other considerations
It is calculated that the wind farm adds 573GWh to the South African national grid every year. This power station saves the country the emission of 600,000 tons of  annually. At the peak of construction an estimated 511 people were employed at the site. This is the 10th renewable power station developed by Enel, under the South African REIPPP program. The list of those power stations, with installed capacity exceeding 800 megawatts, is listed in references 1 and 2 below.

See also

 List of power stations in South Africa
 Wesley–Ciskei Wind Power Station
 Oyster Bay Wind Power Station
 Kangnas Wind Power Station

References

External links
 Garob Wind Farm successfully commissioned As of 6 December 2021.

Economy of the Northern Cape
Wind farms in South Africa
Energy infrastructure in Africa
2021 establishments in South Africa
Energy infrastructure completed in 2021
21st-century architecture in South Africa